Llanfoist is both a village near Abergavenny, in Monmouthshire, Wales, and the community of Llanfoist Fawr. Llanfoist derives from Ffwyst, an early Christian Welsh saint, although the anglicised version of the church patron is Saint Faith. The population was 1,228 in 2011.

The Church of St Faith
1901 Kelly's Directory of Monmouthshire describes the parish church of St Faith's:

The church holds records for baptisms from 1736–1975, for marriages from 1736–1971, for banns from 1824–47 and 1890–1933, and for burials from 1736-1945. There are also Bishops Transcripts for 1725-32, 1734–51, 1753-4, 1756–75, 1777–1806, 1808–10, 1813, 1815–16, 1820–37, 1841–58, 1862–1865, 1869 and 1880.

The parish of Llanelen has historically been held with Llanfoist, although since the retirement of the last resident Rector, the Reverend Thomas Arthur Foster (1923-2010) in 1992 the parishes have been served from Govilon (Llanwenarth Ultra). At the time of his departure, Father Foster was the longest serving incumbent in the Diocese of Monmouth, having held the benefice since 1959. His predecessor, the Reverend Harold Stanley Richards (1888-1976) served between 1930-59. In January 2012 an ancient yew tree in the grounds of St Faith's Church, which was believed to be up to 1,000 years old, was brought down by high winds.

The village also had a Wesleyan Methodist Chapel, erected in 1839. In 1851 the attendance was 200 for morning worship (with 180 scholars), 200 scholars in the afternoon and 40 for evening worship with 50 scholars.

Crawshay Bailey and Alexander Cordell
Llanfoist was home to the ironmaster, Crawshay Bailey. Before 1851 he had retired to Llanfoist House in the village. Llanfoist Primary School had a house named after him until 2008 when the House was renamed 'Skirrid'. He died in 1872, aged 83, after at least seventy years in industry. His only son and heir, also Crawshay Bailey (1841–1887), inherited his estate.

The novelist Alexander Cordell, most famously author of Rape of the Fair Country is buried at Llanfoist.

Amenities and attractions
The Monmouthshire and Brecon Canal runs just above the village.

The village has a church hall, situated on the Merthyr Road, which holds Public Liability Insurance. The Llanfoist Fawr Primary School moved to a new location in the Barratt estate (Ffordd yr Ysgol) on Gypsy Lane and was opened in 2008.

Llanfoist cemetery
Llanfoist Cemetery (also known as New Cemetery), stands on the south bank of the River Usk at the northern edge of Llanfoist. Opened in 1894, its Royal Commission on the Ancient and Historical Monuments of Wales registration describes it as a "good example of a well-preserved Victorian landscaped garden cemetery". The cemetery is listed at Grade II on the Register of Parks and Gardens of Special Historic Interest in Wales.

References

External links

 Old Photos of the canal
 www.geograph.co.uk : photos of Llanfoist and surrounding area
 Llanfoist at genuki.org

Villages in Monmouthshire
Brecon Beacons
River Usk
Registered historic parks and gardens in Monmouthshire